General Güemes is a department located in Salta Province, Argentina.

Towns and municipalities
 General Güemes
 Campo Santo
 El Bordo
 Cobos
 Cabeza de Buey
 Palomitas
 Betania
 Cruz Quemada
 El Salto
 Km 1094
 Las Mesitas
 Virgilio Tedin
 Los Sauces

References

External links 

 Departments of Salta Province website

Departments of Salta Province